The Soul's Place (also known as The Soul's Haven) is a 2003 Italian romantic comedy-drama film, written and directed by Riccardo Milani. For his performance Silvio Orlando was awarded best actor at the Montreal World Film Festival, while Milani won the Premio Flaiano for best director.

Plot
At the port of Vasto, Abruzzo city, the "Carair" car tire factory is about to close, for fraudulent bankruptcy. The factory workers are Tonino, Salvatore and Mario, who struggle with all their strength to prevent layoffs. Tonino does not know that he has a tumor since he has been exposed for many years by the tires of the wheel covers, and he thinks he is happy to live with Nina, a girl who lives in Milan, with whom she runs the weekend in the Abruzzo mountains, looking for the rare bear of Marsica. The workers' protest attracts political opinion, so Tonino, Marco and Salvatore get a meeting in Brussels and then in America, where the Carair multinational is located, getting to work. But right now, Tonino's tumor gets worse...

Cast
 Silvio Orlando as Antonio, aka "Tonino"
 Michele Placido as Salvatore
 Claudio Santamaria as Mario
 Paola Cortellesi as Nina
 Imma Piro as Maddalena
 Flavio Pistilli as Giannino
 Maria Laura Rondanini as Manuela

References

External links
 

2003 comedy-drama films
2003 films
Italian comedy-drama films
Films directed by Riccardo Milani
2000s Italian-language films
2000s Italian films